Rangiora Airfield (NZRT) is located  west-north-west of Rangiora township, north of Christchurch, New Zealand. It is managed by the Waimakariri District Council. It is the base of startup airline Electric Air. The company operates ZK-EAL, a Pipistrel Alpha Electro from the airfield.

It has three grass runways. The runways are unlit, and users are asked to take care when approaching.

There are 40 private hangars located on the airfield site as this is a recreational facility. Users ask that the public respect private property on the field.

Jet A1 and AvGas are available with the use of a 'Swipe Card'.

See also

 List of airports in New Zealand
 List of airlines of New Zealand
 Transport in New Zealand

Airports in New Zealand
Rangiora
Transport buildings and structures in Canterbury, New Zealand